Nottingham Field is an 8,533-seat multi-purpose stadium in the western United States, located on the campus of the University of Northern Colorado in Greeley, Colorado. It is home to the Northern Colorado Bears football and track and field programs.

History
Nottingham field was erected  in 1995 in order to relieve the aging facilities at Jackson Field. UNC won consecutive  Division II national football titles in 1996 and 1997, their second and third seasons at Nottingham Field. The Bears moved up to Division I-AA (now FCS) in 2004 and joined the Big Sky Conference in 2006.

The stadium's initial capacity was 6,500 and it is named for Victor R. Nottingham, a former Colorado State College of Education (UNC) student body president who spearheaded the effort to raise private funds for the entire $4 million project.

Renovations
Prior to the 2005 season, the stadium's seating capacity was expanded to over 8,500 with an additional 1,500 possible in the endzone and the natural grass hill in the northwest corner of the stadium, by expanding the east stands.

In 2015 a scoreboard structure including a Daktronics video board, Bear Vision, was erected beyond the south endzone of the field.

In 2021 the field's surface was updated to IRONTURF. The donor-funded project was completed by Academy Sports Turf, Inc. and premiered in the Bears home opener against Lamar.

Gallery

See also
 List of NCAA Division I FCS football stadiums

References

College football venues
College track and field venues in the United States
Northern Colorado Bears football
Multi-purpose stadiums in the United States
American football venues in Colorado
Athletics (track and field) venues in Colorado
Sports venues completed in 1995
1995 establishments in Colorado